In October 2004, a conference was held at Middlebury College, entitled "The Privatization of National Security." Sponsored in part by the Woodrow Wilson School of Public and International Affairs at Princeton University, the conference discussed the privatization of functions historically considered the sole province of the military and intelligence agencies of the United States government.  One participant, Peter Feaver, said that: "In fact what we’re seeing is a return to neo-feudalism.  If you think about how the India Company played a role in the rise of the British Empire, there are similar parallels to the rise of the American quasi-empire" .

The conference discussed the "outsourcing" of some services within the U.S. intelligence and military sectors. This involves the transfer to the private sector of services previously provided or managed by government (for example, to a private detective agency), a practice that, in the U.S., is simply called "privatization."

See also
Top Secret America

External links

United States national security policy